La Galerie du Palais is a 1632 comedy by Pierre Corneille. The comedy concerns the love relationships of two couples: Lysandre and Celidee; and Dorimant and Hippolyte.

References

1632 plays
Plays by Pierre Corneille